The term Eparchy of Canada may refer to:

 Serbian Orthodox Eparchy of Canada, Canadian eparchy (diocese) of the Serbian Orthodox Church
 Serbian Orthodox Eparchy of America and Canada, former eparchy (1921-1963) of the Serbian Orthodox Church, in the USA and Canada
 Serbian Orthodox Eparchy of Eastern America and Canada, former eparchy (1963-1983) of the Serbian Orthodox Church, in eastern USA and Canada
 Free Serbian Orthodox Eparchy of America and Canada, former eparchy (1963-1991) of the "Free Serbian Orthodox Church", in USA and Canada
 Eparchy of America and Canada (Metropolitanate of New Gračanica), former eparchy (1991-2009) of the Serbian Orthodox Metropolitanate of New Gračanica
 Romanian Orthodox Eparchy of Canada, Canadian eparchy (diocese) of the Romanian Orthodox Church
 Russian Orthodox Eparchy of Montreal and Canada, Canadian eparchy (diocese) of the Russian Orthodox Church Outside Russia
 Ukrainian Orthodox Eparchy of Central Canada, one of eparchies (dioceses) of the Ukrainian Orthodox Church of Canada
 Ukrainian Orthodox Eparchy of Eastern Canada, one of eparchies (dioceses) of the Ukrainian Orthodox Church of Canada
 Ukrainian Orthodox Eparchy of Western Canada, one of eparchies (dioceses) of the Ukrainian Orthodox Church of Canada
 Macedonian Orthodox Eparchy of America and Canada, an eparchy (diocese) of the Macedonian Orthodox Church
 Armenian Eparchy of Canada (Cilicia), Canadian eparchy (diocese) of the Armenian Apostolic Church, under the Holy See of Cilicia
 Assyrian Eparchy of Canada, Canadian eparchy (diocese) of the Assyrian Church of the East

See also
Christianity in Canada
Diocese of Canada (disambiguation)
Eparchy of Eastern America (disambiguation)
Eparchy of Western America (disambiguation)